Estonian Regiment "Reval" (Estonian: Eesti Piirikaitserügement Tallinn) was formed in the early spring of 1944. The regiment comprised only Estonians, and had three battalions. The regiment was led by Major Rubach, helped by Lt. Noorkukk. The regiment's first name was supposed to be Narwa, but that name was already used by another Estonian battalion.

The regiment's first battalion mostly comprised Viljandi County men led by Captain Arnold Purre. The second battalion was made up by Pärnu County men led by Captain Mats Möldre. The third battalion was made up of Tallinn and Tartu County men led by Lt. Parts.

The regiment was sent to the Narva front on February 13, 1944. The regiment was sent without adequate training or equipment (particularly machine guns) and suffered heavy losses, as there were many casualties to Soviet artillery and aircraft.

See also 

20th Waffen Grenadier Division of the SS (1st Estonian)
Estonian Legion

References 

Military units and formations of the Waffen-SS
Military units and formations established in 1944
Military history of Estonia during World War II
Battle of Narva (1944)
Generalbezirk Estland
Military units and formations disestablished in 1945